The Town of Basalt is a home rule municipality located in Eagle and Pitkin counties, Colorado, United States. The town population was 3,984 at the 2020 United States Census with 2,917 residing in Eagle County and 1,067 residing in Pitkin County. Basalt is a part of the Edwards-Glenwood Springs, CO Combined Statistical Area.

History
Basalt was first named Aspen Junction after the railroad junction which led to present day Aspen, Colorado. Aspen Junction was a territory serving Aspen to Leadville Mining towns, with the Railroad Junction, also going West and South to Carbondale and Glenwood Springs. It was first served by the Colorado Midland Railroad, it was later bought out in 1901 by the Denver & Rio Grande Railroad.

The town was named for the basaltic rock formation on Basalt Mountain, and began as a railroad town. The town was incorporated in 1901.

Geography
Basalt is located along State Highway 82, and at the confluence of the Fryingpan and Roaring Fork rivers.

At the 2020 United States Census, the town had a total area of  including  of water.

Demographics

As of the census of 2000, there were 2,681 people, 1,052 households, and 637 families residing in the town. The racial makeup of the town was 91.53% White, 0.48% African American, 0.52% Native American, 1.27% Asian, 0.11% Pacific Islander, 4.77% from other races, and 1.31% from two or more races. Hispanic or Latino of any race were 11.75% of the population.

There were 1,052 households, out of which 34.0% had children under the age of 18 living with them, 50.1% were married couples living together, 7.4% had a female householder with no husband present, and 39.4% were non-families. 24.0% of all households were made up of individuals, and 2.0% had someone living alone who was 65 years of age or older.  The average household size was 2.55 and the average family size was 3.00.

In the town, the population was spread out, with 23.6% under the age of 18, 6.8% from 18 to 24, 42.3% from 25 to 44, 24.4% from 45 to 64, and 3.0% who were 65 years of age or older.  The median age was 34 years. For every 100 females, there were 108.8 males.  For every 100 females age 18 and over, there were 110.6 males.

The median income for a household in the town was $67,200, and the median income for a family was $73,375. Males had a median income of $40,791 versus $30,532 for females. The per capita income for the town was $30,746.  About 4.9% of families and 6.3% of the population were below the poverty line, including 5.9% of those under age 18 and 6.8% of those age 65 or over.

Tourism 
Basalt is well known for its Gold Medal trout fishing in the Frying Pan River.  Ruedi Reservoir is also a popular regional destination for boating and other watersports. Basalt is a hub for mountain biking in the Roaring Fork valley. There are a dozen world class cross country trails as well as lift-accessed downhilling within 15 miles of Basalt, both up and down the valley.

Transportation
 Roaring Fork Transportation Authority (RFTA) provides bus transit in Basalt.
 Basalt's public transit system (WE-CYCLE) supplied by PBSC.

Notable people 
Wally Dallenbach Jr., NASCAR driver
Joey Diaz, comedian
Christy Smith, contestant on Survivor: The Amazon
Torin Yater-Wallace, Former Olympian, freestyle skier and the youngest person ever to medal at the Winter X Games.
Ann Korologos, former United States Secretary of Labor
Tom Korologos, former United States Ambassador to Belgium
Hanna Faulhaber, freestyle skier and Olympian
Neil Diamond, musician

See also

Colorado
Bibliography of Colorado
Index of Colorado-related articles
Outline of Colorado
List of counties in Colorado
List of municipalities in Colorado
List of places in Colorado
List of statistical areas in Colorado
Edwards-Glenwood Springs, CO Combined Statistical Area
Edwards, CO Micropolitan Statistical Area
Glenwood Springs, CO Micropolitan Statistical Area

References

External links

Town of Basalt website
CDOT map of the Town of Basalt
Basalt Chamber of Commerce website

Towns in Eagle County, Colorado
Towns in Pitkin County, Colorado
Towns in Colorado
Roaring Fork Valley